Curly is a surname, given name, nickname or stage name. It may refer to:

First name, nickname or stage name

 Crazy Horse (1840–1877), Oglala Sioux war chief nicknamed "Curly"
 Curly (scout), nickname of Ashishishe (c. 1856–1923), Crow Indian scout for General Custer
 Paul Carlyle Curly Armstrong (1918-1983), American basketball player
 Curly Bill Brocius, nickname of William Brocius (c. 1845-1882), American Old West gunman and outlaw
 Charles Roy Curly Brown (1888-1968), American Major League Baseball pitcher
 Harold Lee Curly Chalker (1931-1998), American country and jazz musician
 Robert F. Curly Clement (1919 – 2006), American baseball umpire
 Curly Ray Cline (1923-1997), American bluegrass fiddler
 Curly, nickname of George Andrew Davis Jr. (1920-1952), American World War II and Korean War flying ace
 Curly Joe DeRita, Three Stooges persona of Joseph Wardell, whose stage name was Joe DeRita (1909 – 1993), American actor and comedian
 Clarence T. "Curly" Edwinson (1912 – 1985). American fighter pilot and flying ace of World War II, football player and skeet shooter
 Curly Evans, nickname of Neal Evans (c. 1888–1945), American born Canadian freight industry entrepreneur
 Arnim LeRoy Curly Fox (1910-1995), American county music singer and musician
 Curly Hammond (1879–1963), English rugby union player
 Erling George Curly Haugland, American politician and businessman
 Hubert Edward Curly Hinchman (1907 – 1968), American football player
 Curly Howard, stage name of comic actor Jerome Lester Horwitz (1903–1952), Three Stooges actor
 Curly Howard (DJ), stage name of Howard Sisk (c. 1930–2001), on-air name of American disc jockey Howard Sisk
 Greg 'Curly' Keranen, American bassist and guitarist
 Earl Louis Curly Lambeau (1898-1965), founder, player and first coach of the Green Bay Packers
 Lillian Curly Lawrence, who was born William Morris Benjamin, also known as LBSC (1883 – 1967), British model locomotive designer
 Curly Lino, nickname of Frank Lino (born 1938), Sicilian-American mobster
 Albert Charles Curly Linton (5 September 1895 – 25 July 1985) was an Anzac veteran and Australian rules footballer 
 Gordon 'Curly' Mack, whose full name is Gordon Sylvester Bradshaw Mack (1898-1948), Irish badminton player of the 1920s and '30s
 Curly M.C., a pseudonym of Michael Cretu (born 1957), Romanian-German musician
 Curly Moe, ring name Donald Chester Zalesky (1962 – 2015), Canadian-American wrestler
 Fred "Curly" Morrison (born 1926), American National Football League player
 Frederick Curly Neal, nickname of Neal (1942–2020), American basketball player, member of the Harlem Globetrotters
 Olaf Gustave Hazard Curly Oden (1899-1978), American National Football League player
 Warren Harvey Curly Ogden (1901-1964), American Major League Baseball pitcher
 Milford Laurenson Curly Page (1902-1987), New Zealand cricketer
 Donald "Curly" Phillips (1884-1938) Canadian guide, outfitter, entrepreneur, and explorer
 Claude Curly Putman Jr. (born 1930), American songwriter
 John Ray Curly Seckler (born 1919), American bluegrass musician
 Edward Curly Thirlwell (1905-1985), American sound engineer nominated for two Academy Awards
 Konrad the Curly (c. 1198 – 1213), Polish noble

Fictional characters 
 Curly McLain, in the musical Oklahoma!
 Curly Washburn, in the movies City Slickers and City Slickers II: The Legend of Curly's Gold
 Norman Curly Watts, in the British soap opera Coronation Street
 Marshal "Curly" Wilcox, in the movie Stagecoach
 Curly, in the British comic strip Dennis the Menace and Gnasher
 Curly, a Lost Boy in Peter Pan
 Curly, a rabbit in the Canadian television series Abby Hatcher

Animals 
 "Curly" or "Little Curly", a nickname of Laika, the first dog in space
 Curly Horse, a curly-coated breed of horse
 Curly, the name of the first LaPerm cat

See also 

Curlee (name)
Curley, name list
Curli, protein
 Bolesław IV the Curly (c. 1125-1173), Duke of Masovia and High Duke of Poland

Lists of people by nickname